Dadu District, is a district of Sindh Province, Pakistan. With headquarters the city of Dadu, the district was created in 1931 by merging Kotri and Mahal Kohistan (later Jamshoro) tehsils from Karachi District and Mehar, Khairpur Nathan Shah, Dadu, Johi and Sehwan tehsils from Larkana District. In 2004, several talukas in the south were split off to create the new Jamshoro District. Its boundary touches with four districts of Sindh i.e. Jamshoro, Naushahro Feroze, Shaheed Benazirabad and Kamber Shahdadkot.

Demographics
At the time of the 2017 census, Dadu district had a population of 1,550,390, of which 795,700 were males and 754,480 were females. The rural population was 1,166,984 (75.27%) and urban 383,406 (24.72%). The literacy rate is 47.26%: 57.92% for males and 36.02% for females.

The majority religion is Islam, with 99.37% of the population. Hinduism (including those from Scheduled Castes) is practiced by 0.58% of the population. Sindhi was the predominant language, spoken by 97.84% of the population.

Tehsils 

District Dadu has four tehsils, as tabulated below,:

The District has 14 Circles, 111 Tapa and 351 Dehs.

Places of interest
Gorakh Hill - Hill station and the highest point in Sindh.
Manchar Lake - Largest fresh water lake in Pakistan. 
Jamia Mosque (Khudabad) - the oldest mosques in Dadu
Yar Muhammad Kalhoro Tomb
Ghazi Shah Mound
Ancient graves in Wahi Pandhi
Ali Murad Mound
Ancient Rock Carvings of Sindh
Thul Hairo Khan
Nai Gaj
Nai Gaj Dam
Necropolis of Mian Nasir Muhammad Kalhoro
Cemetery of Mir Allahyar Talpur
Shiva Mandir Johi

List of Dehs
The following is a list of Dadu District's 351 dehs, organised by taluka:

Dadu taluka (67 dehs)

Johi taluka (110 dehs)

Khairpur Nathan Shah taluka (94 dehs)

Mehar taluka (80 dehs)

References

Bibliography

 
Districts of Sindh